Denker is a Dutch and German noun meaning "thinker". Notable people with the surname include: 

 Arnold Denker (1914–2005), American chess player
 Henry Denker (1912–2012), American novelist and playwright
 Lydia Denker (born 1982), German-Australian singer-songwriter
 Travis Denker (born 1985), American baseball player

Dencker
 Nils Dencker (born 1953), Swedish mathematician

Denkers
 Dirk Denkers, American soccer player

See also 
 Denker Tournament of High School Champions, chess tournament
 Der Denker-Club (The Thinkers Club), cartoon based on a fictitious group of professors and scholars
 Denk (disambiguation)
 Dencker
 Denke

German-language surnames